Observator Cultural (meaning "The Cultural Observer" in English) is a weekly literary magazine based in Bucharest, Romania. The magazine was started in 2000. The weekly publishes articles on Romania's cultural and arts scene as well as political affairs.

See also
 List of magazines in Romania

References

External links
 Observator Cultural online

2000 establishments in Romania
Magazines established in 2000
Magazines published in Bucharest
Romanian-language magazines
Literary magazines published in Romania
Weekly magazines published in Romania